FC Polet is a professional football club founded and based in Samara, Samarskaya Oblast, Russia. The football club was founded in the mid 1970s in cooperation and under the sponsorship of Kurumoch International Airport and Alexander Mikhailkovich, a USSR theater performer. Today, FC Polet is sponsored by JSC "Kurumoch International Airport", which is managed by Kurumoch International Airport.

Football clubs in Russia